The Blast Furnace is a 1950 North Korean film directed by Min Chongshik. The script was written by Kim Yonggun. It was produced by the Division of Film Productions of the Korean Workers' Party.

The film was released during the Korean War.

Plot
Ryongsu, a worker working at the blasting furnace, suggests a way to develop fire bricks with their own technology without relying on import, but the technicians at the plant ignores Ryongsu's suggestions. Ryongsu and his assistant Hyeyoung work day and night researching fire bricks, and this upsets Ryongyeon, wife of Ryongsu who is jealous of their relationship. Ryongsu sends a letter to Ryongyeon to clear some misunderstandings, but the  misunderstanding remains, due to her lack of ability to read. Ryongyeon studies hangul. Ryongsu's research is endangered by spies, and Ryongyeon appears and saves the day.

Reception
The film was the second drama film that was to be released in North Korean cinema. Many famous stars of Korean film, including Moon Ye-bong, were in the film.

See also 
 Cinema of North Korea
 List of North Korean films

References 

1950 films
North Korean drama films
1950s Korean-language films